Novy is a rural locality (a settlement) in Yablonovskoye Rural Settlement of Takhtamukaysky District, the Republic of Adygea, Russia. The population was 2173 as of 2018. There are 21 streets.

Geography 
The settlement is located on the left bank of the Kuban River, 12 km north of Takhtamukay (the district's administrative centre) by road. Kozet is the nearest rural locality.

References 

Rural localities in Takhtamukaysky District